Eastampton Township is a township in Burlington County, in the U.S. state of New Jersey. As of the 2020 United States census, the township's population was 6,191, an increase of 122 (+2.0%) from the 2010 census count of 6,069, which in turn reflected a decline of 133 (−2.1%) from the 6,202 counted in the 2000 census.

History
Eastampton Township was incorporated as a township by an act of the New Jersey Legislature on February 11, 1880, from portions of Westampton Township. Portions of both Lumberton Township and Southampton Township were annexed in 1882.

Eastampton is the location of Smithville, an industrial community created by Hezekiah Bradley Smith for his machine company, which produced the American Star Bicycle. It is now a county park.

Geography
According to the United States Census Bureau, the township had a total area of 5.82 square miles (15.06 km2), including 5.73 square miles (14.84 km2) of land and 0.09 square miles (0.22 km2) of water (1.48%).

The township borders the Burlington County municipalities of Lumberton Township, Mount Holly Township, Pemberton Township, Southampton Township, Springfield Township and Westampton Township.

Unincorporated communities, localities and place names located partially or completely within the township include Smithville and Turpentine.

Demographics

2010 census

The Census Bureau's 2006–2010 American Community Survey showed that (in 2010 inflation-adjusted dollars) median household income was $73,393 (with a margin of error of +/− $10,010) and the median family income was $91,375 (+/− $8,669). Males had a median income of $60,405 (+/− $4,400) versus $44,028 (+/− $8,940) for females. The per capita income for the borough was $32,065 (+/− $2,298). About 3.0% of families and 5.0% of the population were below the poverty line, including 6.8% of those under age 18 and 3.2% of those age 65 or over.

2000 census
As of the 2000 United States census there were 6,202 people, 2,226 households, and 1,638 families residing in the township. The racial makeup of the township was 78.25% White, 11.77% African American, 0.23% Native American, 5.42% Asian, 1.44% from other races, and 2.90% from two or more races. Hispanic or Latino of any race were 4.72% of the population.

There were 2,226 households, out of which 42.2% had children under the age of 18 living with them, 61.2% were married couples living together, 8.4% had a female householder with no husband present, and 26.4% were non-families. 21.5% of all households were made up of individuals, and 4.5% had someone living alone who was 65 years of age or older. The average household size was 2.78 and the average family size was 3.29.

In the township the population was spread out, with 29.5% under the age of 18, 7.0% from 18 to 24, 35.3% from 25 to 44, 21.0% from 45 to 64, and 7.2% who were 65 years of age or older. The median age was 35 years. For every 100 females, there were 99.0 males.  For every 100 females age 18 and over, there were 98.2 males.

The median income for a household in the township was $66,406, and the median income for a family was $71,765. Males had a median income of $46,486 versus $31,208 for females. The per capita income for the township was $24,534.  About 2.0% of families and 2.9% of the population were below the poverty line, including 2.0% of those under age 18 and 4.3% of those age 65 or over.

Government

Local government 
Eastampton Township is governed the Faulkner Act (formally known as the Optional Municipal Charter Law) under the Council-Manager system of municipal government (Plan E), implemented based on the recommendations of a Charter Study Commission as of January 1, 1983. The residents of Eastampton adopted the Council-Manager form of New Jersey municipal government based on a referendum passed in 1982. The township is one of 42 municipalities (of the 564) statewide that use this form of government. The Eastampton Township Council is comprised of five members elected at-large in partisan elections to staggered four-year terms of office, with either two or three seats coming up for election in even-numbered years as part of the November general election. The Mayor and Deputy Mayor are selected by the Council from among its members at a reorganization meeting held each year during the first week of January. The Mayor coordinates the work of the Council, chairs Council meetings and is the township's public representative. The Mayor also signs all contracts and obligations of the Township and is empowered to perform marriages.

, members of the Eastampton Township Council are Mayor Robert Apgar (D, term on council ends December 31, 2024; term as mayor ends December 31, 2023), Deputy Mayor Dominic Santillo (D, term on council ends 2026; term as deputy mayor ends 2023), Anthony Zeno (D, 2024), Gerald "Jay" Springer (D, 2024) and Ricardo Rodriguez (D, 2026).

Federal, state and county representation 
Eastampton Township is located in the 3rd Congressional District and is part of New Jersey's 8th state legislative district.

 

Burlington County is governed by a Board of County Commissioners comprised of five members who are chosen at-large in partisan elections to serve three-year terms of office on a staggered basis, with either one or two seats coming up for election each year; at an annual reorganization meeting, the board selects a director and deputy director from among its members to serve a one-year term. , Burlington County's Commissioners are
Director Felicia Hopson (D, Willingboro Township, term as commissioner ends December 31, 2024; term as director ends 2023),
Deputy Director Tom Pullion (D, Edgewater Park, term as commissioner and as deputy director ends 2023),
Allison Eckel (D, Medford, 2025),
Daniel J. O'Connell (D, Delran Township, 2024) and 
Balvir Singh (D, Burlington Township, 2023). 
Burlington County's Constitutional Officers are
County Clerk Joanne Schwartz (R, Southampton Township, 2023)
Sheriff James H. Kostoplis (D, Bordentown, 2025) and 
Surrogate Brian J. Carlin (D, Burlington Township, 2026).

Politics
As of March 2011, there were a total of 3,610 registered voters in Eastampton Township, of which 1,160 (32.1% vs. 33.3% countywide) were registered as Democrats, 772 (21.4% vs. 23.9%) were registered as Republicans and 1,678 (46.5% vs. 42.8%) were registered as Unaffiliated. There were no voters registered to other parties. Among the township's 2010 Census population, 59.5% (vs. 61.7% in Burlington County) were registered to vote, including 78.8% of those ages 18 and over (vs. 80.3% countywide).

n the 2012 presidential election, Democrat Barack Obama received 1,651 votes (59.7% vs. 58.1% countywide), ahead of Republican Mitt Romney with 1,069 votes (38.6% vs. 40.2%) and other candidates with 29 votes (1.0% vs. 1.0%), among the 2,766 ballots cast by the township's 3,802 registered voters, for a turnout of 72.8% (vs. 74.5% in Burlington County). In the 2008 presidential election, Democrat Barack Obama received 1,754 votes (58.8% vs. 58.4% countywide), ahead of Republican John McCain with 1,172 votes (39.3% vs. 39.9%) and other candidates with 36 votes (1.2% vs. 1.0%), among the 2,981 ballots cast by the township's 3,786 registered voters, for a turnout of 78.7% (vs. 80.0% in Burlington County). In the 2004 presidential election, Democrat John Kerry received 1,442 votes (52.6% vs. 52.9% countywide), ahead of Republican George W. Bush with 1,269 votes (46.3% vs. 46.0%) and other candidates with 15 votes (0.5% vs. 0.8%), among the 2,741 ballots cast by the township's 3,458 registered voters, for a turnout of 79.3% (vs. 78.8% in the whole county).

In the 2013 gubernatorial election, Republican Chris Christie received 945 votes (58.4% vs. 61.4% countywide), ahead of Democrat Barbara Buono with 637 votes (39.4% vs. 35.8%) and other candidates with 16 votes (1.0% vs. 1.2%), among the 1,617 ballots cast by the township's 3,796 registered voters, yielding a 42.6% turnout (vs. 44.5% in the county). In the 2009 gubernatorial election, Republican Chris Christie received 886 votes (48.2% vs. 47.7% countywide), ahead of Democrat Jon Corzine with 818 votes (44.5% vs. 44.5%), Independent Chris Daggett with 99 votes (5.4% vs. 4.8%) and other candidates with 29 votes (1.6% vs. 1.2%), among the 1,840 ballots cast by the township's 3,760 registered voters, yielding a 48.9% turnout (vs. 44.9% in the county).

Education 
For kindergarten through eighth grade, public school students are served by the Eastampton Township School District at Eastampton Community School.As of the 2020–21 school year, the district, comprised of one school, had an enrollment of 561 students and 46.2 classroom teachers (on an FTE basis), for a student–teacher ratio of 12.1:1.

Public school students in ninth through twelfth grades attend Rancocas Valley Regional High School, a regional public high school serving students from five communities encompassing approximately  comprising the communities of Eastampton Township, Hainesport Township, Lumberton, Mount Holly and Westampton. As of the 2020–21 school year, the high school had an enrollment of 2,069 students and 139.6 classroom teachers (on an FTE basis), for a student–teacher ratio of 14.8:1. The school is located in Mount Holly Township. The district's board of education has nine members who are elected directly by voters to serve three-year terms of office on a staggered basis, with three seats up for election each year as part of the November general election. Seats on the board are allocated based on the population of the five constituent municipalities, with one seat assigned to Eastampton.

Students from Eastampton Township, and from all of Burlington County, are eligible to attend the Burlington County Institute of Technology, a countywide public school district that serves the vocational and technical education needs of students at the high school and post-secondary level at its campuses in Medford and Westampton Township.

Transportation

U.S. Route 206 is the most prominent highway serving Eastampton, running north–south along the township's border with Pemberton Township. County Route 537 also crosses the township with an east–west orientation.

Notable people

People who were born in, residents of, or otherwise closely associated with Eastampton Township include:

 Charles R. Chickering (1891–1970), freelance artist who designed 77 U.S. postage stamps while working at the Bureau of Engraving and Printing
 Hezekiah Bradley Smith (1816–1887), inventor and a Democratic Party politician who represented New Jersey's 2nd congressional district in the United States House of Representatives from 1879 to 1881

References

External links

Eastampton Township website

 
1880 establishments in New Jersey
Faulkner Act (council–manager)
Populated places established in 1880
Townships in Burlington County, New Jersey